University of Pardubice ( or UPA) is a university in Pardubice, the Czech Republic. In 2021 it had nearly 8,000 students. It is the only university in Pardubice Region.

History
In the aftermath of the World War II, chemical factories in the city asked for the establishment of a specialised university in their vicinity. Since 1990, new faculties have been added, and in 1994 the institution was renamed to University of Pardubice.

Faculties
 Jan Perner Transportat Faculty (Dopravní fakulta Jana Pernera, DF JP, est. 1992) 
 Faculty of Economics And Administration (Fakulta ekonomicko-správní Pardubice, FES, est. 1991) 
 Faculty of Arts and Philosophy (Fakulta filozofická, formerly Fakulta humanitních studií, est. 1992) 
 Faculty of Chemical Technology (Fakulta chemicko-technologická, FChT, est. 1950)  
 Faculty of Art Restoration (Fakulta restaurování in Litomyšl, FR, est. 2005) 
 Faculty of Electrical Engineering and Informatics (Fakulta elektrotechniky a informatiky, FEI, est. 2002) 
 Faculty of Health Studies (Fakulta zdravotnických studií, FZS, est. 2002)

References

External links
 University of Pardubice (en)
 Univerzita Pardubica (cz)

Universities in the Czech Republic
Pardubice Region
Educational institutions established in 1950
1950 establishments in Czechoslovakia